The diaeresis is a diacritical mark used to indicate the separation of two distinct vowels in adjacent syllables when an instance of diaeresis (or hiatus) occurs, so as to distinguish from a digraph or diphthong.

The diaeresis diacritic indicates that two adjoining letters that would normally form a digraph and be pronounced as one sound, are instead to be read as separate vowels in two syllables. For example, in the spelling "coöperate", the diaeresis reminds the reader that the word has four syllables co-op-er-ate, not three, *coop-er-ate. In British English this usage has been considered obsolete for many years, and in US English, although it persisted for longer, it is now considered archaic as well. Nevertheless, it is still used by the US magazine The New Yorker. In English language texts it is perhaps most familiar in the loan words naïve, Noël and Chloë, and is also used officially in the name of the island Teän and of Coös County. Languages such as Dutch, Afrikaans, Catalan, French, Galician, and Spanish make regular use of the diaeresis.

Name 
The word diaeresis is from Greek , meaning "division", "separation", or "distinction".
The word trema, used in linguistics and also classical scholarship, is from the Greek  and means a "perforation", "orifice", or "pip" (as on dice), thus describing the form of the diacritic rather than its function.

History 

The diaeresis was borrowed for this purpose in several languages of western and southern Europe, among them Occitan, Catalan, French, Dutch, Welsh, and (rarely) English. As a further extension, some languages began to use a diaeresis whenever a vowel letter was to be pronounced separately. This included vowels that would otherwise form digraphs with consonants or simply be silent. In the few exceptions where the u is pronounced, a diaeresis is added to it.

Examples:
 Spanish   "penguin"
 Catalan   "waters", qüestió  "matter, question"
 Occitan   "linguist",   "aquatic"
 French  or   "acute (fem.)"
 Note that the e is silent in most modern accents; without the diacritic, both the e and the u would be silent, or pronounced as a schwa in accents that have conserved all post-consonantal schwas, including in poetry recitation, as in the proper name  .
 Galician   "I shrank", saïamos "we went out/used to go out"
 Luxembourgish   "opportunity", Chancë  (before a consonant) "opportunities"
 English Brontë  (see Brontë family)
 Afrikaans  "Higher"

This has been extended to Ganda, where a diaeresis separates y from n: anya , anÿa .

'Ÿ' is sometimes used in transcribed Greek, where it represents the Greek letter υ (upsilon) in hiatus with α. For example, it can be seen in the transcription  of the Persian name  at the very end of Herodotus, or the name of Mount Taÿgetus on the southern Peloponnesus peninsula, which in modern Greek is spelled .

Modern usage 
In Catalan, the digraphs ai, ei, oi, au, eu, and iu are normally read as diphthongs. The Occitan use of diaeresis is very similar to that of Catalan: ai, ei, oi, au, eu, ou are diphthongs consisting of one syllable but aï, eï, oï, aü, eü, oü are groups consisting of two distinct syllables.

However, hyphenation is now preferred for compound words so that  (sea duck) is now spelled .

In Modern English, the diaeresis, the grave accent and the acute accent are the only diacritics used apart from loanwords. It may be used optionally for words that do not have a morphological break at the diaeresis point, such as "naïve", "Boötes", and "Noël". It is far less commonly used in words such as "coördinate" and "reënter" except in a very few publicationsnotably The New Yorker and MIT Technology Review under Jason Pontinand this usage is considered by prescriptive writing guides to be largely archaic. The diaeresis mark is sometimes used in English personal first and last names to indicate that two adjacent vowels should be pronounced separately, rather than as a diphthong. Examples include the given names Chloë and Zoë, which otherwise might be pronounced with a silent e. 

In French, some diphthongs that were written with pairs of vowel letters were later reduced to monophthongs, which led to an extension of the value of this diacritic. It often now indicates that the second vowel letter is to be pronounced separately from the first, rather than merge with it into a single sound. The English spelling of Noël meaning "Christmas" comes from this use. Ÿ occurs in French as a variant of ï in a few proper nouns, as in the name of the Parisian suburb of L'Haÿ-les-Roses  and in the surname of the house of Croÿ . In some names, a diaeresis is used to indicate two vowels historically in hiatus, although the second vowel has since fallen silent, as in Saint-Saëns  and de Staël .

For example, when the feminine e is added to aigu  "sharp", the pronunciation does not change in most accents: aiguë  as opposed to the city name Aigues-Mortes . Similar is the feminine noun   "hemlock"; compare   "fig". In the ongoing French spelling reform of 1990, this was moved to the u. (In   the e is not silent, and so is not affected by the spelling reform.)

In Galician, diaeresis is employed to indicate hiatus in the first and second persons of the plural of the imperfect tense of verbs ended in -aer, -oer, -aír and -oír. This stems from the fact that an unstressed -i- is left between vowels, but constituting its own syllable, which would end with a form identical in writing but different in pronunciation with those of the Present subjunctive, as those have said i forming a diphthong with the following a.

In German, in addition to the pervasive use of umlaut diacritics with vowels, diaeresis above e occurs in a few proper names, such as Ferdinand Piëch and Bernhard Hoëcker.

In Portuguese, a diaeresis was used in (mainly Brazilian) Portuguese until the 1990 Orthographic Agreement. After the implementation of the Orthographic Agreement, it was abolished altogether from all Portuguese words.

See also
 Two dots (disambiguation)

Notes

References

External links 

Latin-script diacritics
Greek-script diacritics
Cyrillic-script diacritics